Matías Omar Pérez Laborda (born 20 July 1985) is a Uruguayan football player who plays as a left back.

Career
Pérez began his career playing for Uruguayan club Peñarol in 2006. He joined Danubio in 2007.

In 2009 Pérez joined Argentine side Arsenal de Sarandí. He made his debut for the club on 22 August 2009 in a 0–2 home defeat to Estudiantes de La Plata. He scored his first goal for the club on 8 October 2009 in a 4–1 away defeat to Colón de Santa Fe.

In August 2010 he returned to Danubio. After playing the Torneo Apertura with Danubio, when he scored 2 goals in 11 matches he left the club to join Santiago Wanderers.

External links
 
 
  
 

1985 births
Living people
People from Soriano Department
Uruguayan footballers
Uruguayan expatriate footballers
Association football defenders
Peñarol players
Danubio F.C. players
Arsenal de Sarandí footballers
Quilmes Atlético Club footballers
Santiago Wanderers footballers
Club Deportivo Universidad Católica footballers
Juventud de Las Piedras players
AC Omonia players
Rentistas players
Boston River players
Centro Atlético Fénix players
Atenas de San Carlos players
Uruguayan Primera División players
Uruguayan Segunda División players
Chilean Primera División players
Argentine Primera División players
Cypriot First Division players
Uruguayan expatriate sportspeople in Argentina
Uruguayan expatriate sportspeople in Chile
Uruguayan expatriate sportspeople in Cyprus
Expatriate footballers in Argentina
Expatriate footballers in Chile
Expatriate footballers in Cyprus